Three Fish is the debut studio album by the American rock band Three Fish. It was released on June 11, 1996 through Epic Records.

Overview
Three Fish is a musical collaboration between Jeff Ament of Pearl Jam, Robbi Robb of Tribe After Tribe, and Richard Stuverud of the Fastbacks. The album's recording sessions took place from August 1994 to January 1996 at John & Stu's Place and Avast Recording Co. in Seattle, Washington. The band worked with producer John Goodmanson, who also mixed the album. The album's cover art was illustrated by Ames Design. The album's songs combine rock music with mystical-style Eastern music. The album received critical recognition. David Fricke of Rolling Stone said, "The whole thing is a weird mix – folky self-obsession, crackling pop, heavy, metallic sighing – but Three Fish is definitely worth, in the words of one song, 'a lovely meander.'" Music videos were made for the songs "Laced" and "Song for a Dead Girl".

Track listing

LP track listing

Personnel

Three Fish
Jeff Ament – organ, bass guitar, guitar, percussion, electric guitar, background vocals, 12-string guitar, djembe, fretless bass, photography
Robbi Robb – acoustic guitar, guitar, percussion, electric guitar, sitar, vocals, background vocals, 12-string guitar
Richard Stuverud – drums, background vocals, steel drums

Additional musicians and production
Barry Ament, Chris McGann – woodcuts
Ames Design – artwork
Cary Ecklund – guitar, keyboards, background vocals, mellotron
John Goodmanson – production, recording, mixing, engineering
Stone Gossard – keyboards on "Strangers in My Head"
Stuart Hallerman – recording
Bob Ludwig – mastering
Three Fish – production, photography

References

1996 debut albums
Albums produced by John Goodmanson
Epic Records albums
Three Fish albums
Albums produced by Jeff Ament